Cornelis Floriszoon Schuyt (1557 – 9 June 1616) was a Dutch organist and Renaissance composer.

Life
Cornelis Floriszoon Schuyt was born in Leiden in 1557. He was the son of Floris Corneliszoon Schuyt (1529/30–1601), the organist of two churches in Leiden, the Pieterskerk and the Hooglandse Kerk.

Schuyt was introduced to Renaissance music. on a study trip to Italy.

In 1593, alongside his father, Schuyt became an organist in the Pieterskerk and the Hooglandse Kerk, . After his father's death in 1601, he became the Pieterskerk's main organist.

Schuyt published four volumes with compositions, with three volumes of madrigals. None of his organ music has survived.

Schuyt died on 9 June 1616 and was buried in the Pieterskerk, a church in Leiden.

Remembrance 

Works 

 Il primo libro de madrigali a cinque voci (1600)
  (1603)
 Hymeneo, overo Madrigali nuptiali et altri amorosi (1611)
 Dodeci Padovane, et altretante Gagliarde Composte nelli dodeci modi (1611)

External links
 List of Cornelis Schuyt's musical compositions
 List of Cornelis Schuyt musical pieces
List of Cornelis Schuyt's choral works

References 

1557 births
1616 deaths
Burials at Pieterskerk, Leiden
Dutch male classical composers
Dutch classical composers
Dutch organists
Male organists
People from Leiden
Renaissance composers